Thomas Bewick (c. 11 August 1753 – 8 November 1828) was an English wood-engraver and natural history author. Early in his career he took on all kinds of work such as engraving cutlery, making the wood blocks for advertisements, and illustrating children's books. He gradually turned to illustrating, writing and publishing his own books, gaining an adult audience for the fine illustrations in A History of Quadrupeds.

His career began when he was apprenticed to engraver Ralph Beilby in Newcastle upon Tyne. He became a partner in the business and eventually took it over. Apprentices whom Bewick trained include John Anderson, Luke Clennell, and William Harvey, who in their turn became well known as painters and engravers.

Bewick is best known for his A History of British Birds, which is admired today mainly for its wood engravings, especially the small, sharply observed, and often humorous vignettes known as tail-pieces. The book was the forerunner of all modern field guides. He notably illustrated editions of Aesop's Fables throughout his life.

He is "usually considered the founder of wood-engraving" as "the first to realize its full potentialities", using metal-engraving tools to cut hard boxwood across the grain, producing printing blocks that could be integrated with metal type, but were much more detailed and durable than traditional woodcuts. The result was high-quality illustration at a low price.

Life 

Bewick was born at Cherryburn, a house in the village of Mickley, Northumberland, near Newcastle upon Tyne on 10 or 11 August 1753, although his birthday was always celebrated on the 12th. His parents were tenant farmers: his father John had been married before his union with Jane, and was in his forties when Thomas, the eldest of eight, was born. John rented a small colliery at Mickley Bank, which employed perhaps six men. Bewick attended school in the nearby village of Ovingham.

Bewick did not flourish at schoolwork, but at a very early age showed a talent for drawing. He had no lessons in art. At the age of 14 he was apprenticed to Ralph Beilby, an engraver in Newcastle, where he learnt how to engrave on wood and metal, for example marking jewellery and cutlery with family names and coats of arms. In Beilby's workshop Bewick engraved a series of diagrams on wood for Charles Hutton, illustrating a treatise on measurement. He seems thereafter to have devoted himself entirely to engraving on wood, and in 1775 he received a prize from the Royal Society for the Encouragement of Arts, Manufactures and Commerce for a wood engraving of the "Huntsman and the Old Hound" from Select Fables by the late Mr Gay, which he was illustrating.

In 1776 Bewick became a partner in Beilby's workshop. The joint business prospered, becoming Newcastle's leading engraving service with an enviable reputation for high-quality work and good service. In September 1776 he went to London for eight months, finding the city rude, deceitful and cruel, and much disliking the unfairness of extreme wealth and poverty side by side. He returned to his beloved Newcastle as soon as he could, but his time in the capital gave him a wider reputation, business experience, and an awareness of new movements in art.

In 1786, when he was financially secure, he married Isabella Elliott from Ovingham; she had been a friend when they were children. They had four children, Robert, Jane, Isabella, and Elizabeth; the daughters worked on their father's memoir after his death. At that period in his life he was described by the Newcastle artist Thomas Sword Good as "a man of athletic make, nearly 6 feet high and proportionally stout. He possessed great personal courage and in his younger years was not slow to repay an insult with personal chastisement. On one occasion, being assaulted by two pitmen on returning from a visit to Cherryburn, he resolutely turned upon the aggressors, and as he said, 'paid them both well'."

Bewick was also noted as having a strong moral sense and was an early campaigner for fair treatment of animals. He objected to the docking of horses' tails, the mistreatment of performing animals such as bears, and cruelty to dogs. Above all, he thought war utterly pointless. All these themes recur in his engravings, which echo Hogarth's attention to moral themes. For example, he shows wounded soldiers with wooden legs, back from the wars, and animals with a gallows in the background.

Bewick had at least 30 pupils who worked for him and Beilby as apprentices, the first of which was his younger brother John. Several gained distinction as engravers, including John Anderson, Luke Clennell, Charlton Nesbit, William Harvey, Robert Johnson, and his son and later partner Robert Elliot Bewick.

The partners published their History of Quadrupeds in 1790, intended for children but reaching an adult readership, and its success encouraged them to consider a more serious work of natural history. In preparation for this Bewick spent several years engraving the wood blocks for Land Birds, the first volume of A History of British Birds. Given his detailed knowledge of the birds of Northumberland, Bewick prepared the illustrations, so Beilby was given the task of assembling the text, which he struggled to do. Bewick ended up writing most of the text, which led to a dispute over authorship; Bewick refused to have Beilby named as the author, and in the end only Bewick's name appeared on the title-page, along with a paragraph of explanation at the end of the preface.

The book was an immediate success when published—by Beilby and Bewick themselves—in 1797. Before its publication, Bewick illustrated Arnaud Berquin's Looking-Glass for the Mind in 1792 and J. H. Wynne's Tales for Youth in 1794 for the printer Elizabeth Newbery and in 1795 a anthology on the study of character in the Kings and Queens of England. Given the success of the 1797 publication of his bird illustrations, Bewick started work at once on the second volume, Water Birds, but the disagreement over authorship led to a final split with Beilby. Bewick was unable to control his feelings and resolve issues quietly, so the partnership ended, turbulently and expensively, leaving Bewick with his own workshop. Bewick had to pay £20, equivalent to about £20,000 in 2011, in lawyer's fees, and more than £21 for Beilby's share of the workshop equipment.

With the assistance of his apprentices Bewick brought out the second volume, Water Birds, in 1804, as the sole author. He found the task of managing the printers continually troublesome, but the book met with as much success as the first volume.

In April 1827, the American naturalist and bird painter John James Audubon came to Britain to find a suitable printer for his enormous Birds of America. Bewick, still lively at age 74, showed him the woodcut he was working on, a dog afraid of tree stumps that seem in the dark to be devilish figures, and gave Audubon a copy of his Quadrupeds for his children.

Bewick was fond of the music of Northumberland, and of the Northumbrian smallpipes in particular. He especially wanted to promote the Northumbrian smallpipes, and to support the piper John Peacock, so he encouraged Peacock to teach pupils to become masters of this kind of music. One of these pupils was Thomas's son, Robert, whose surviving manuscript tunebooks give a picture of a piper's repertoire in the 1820s.

Bewick's last wood engraving, Waiting for Death, was of an old bony workhorse, standing forlorn by a tree stump, which he had seen and sketched as an apprentice; the work echoes William Hogarth's last work, The Bathos, which shows the fallen artist by a broken column. He died after a few days' illness on 8 November 1828, at his home. He was buried in Ovingham churchyard, beside his wife Isabella, who had died two years earlier, and not far from his parents and his brother John.

Work

Technique 

Bewick's art is considered the pinnacle of his medium, now called wood engraving. This is due both to his skill and to the method, which unlike the woodcut technique of his predecessors, carves against the grain, in hard box wood, using fine tools normally favoured by metal engravers.

Boxwood cut across the end-grain is hard enough for fine engraving, allowing greater detail than in normal woodcuts; this has largely replaced the basic woodcut since Bewick's time. In addition, since wood engraving is a relief printing technique, inked on the face, it requires only low pressure to print an image, so the blocks last for many thousands of prints, and importantly can be assembled into the same forme as the letterpress or metal type for the text, allowing both on the same page, and all the printing to be done in a single run. In contrast, copper plate engravings are an intaglio printing technique, inked in the engraved grooves, the face being wiped clean of ink before printing, so a special type of printing press applying much higher pressure is required, and images must be printed separately from the text, at far greater expense.

Bewick made use of his close observation of nature, his remarkable visual memory, and his sharp eyesight to create accurate and extremely small details in his wood engravings, which proved to be both a strength and a weakness. If properly printed and closely examined, his prints could be seen to convey subtle clues to the character of his natural subjects, with humour and feeling. This was achieved by carefully varying the depth of the engraved grooves to provide actual greys, not only black and white, as well as the pattern of the marks to provide texture. But this subtlety of engraving created a serious technical difficulty for his printers; they needed to ink his blocks with just the right amount of ink, mixed so as to be of exactly the right thickness, and to press the block to the paper slowly and carefully, to obtain a result that would satisfy Bewick. Not surprisingly, this made printing slow and expensive. It also created a problem for Bewick's readers; if they lacked his excellent eyesight, they needed a magnifying glass to study his prints, especially the miniature tail-pieces. But the effect was transformative, and wood engraving became the main method of illustrating books for a century. The quality of Bewick's engravings attracted a far wider readership to his books than he had expected: his Fables and Quadrupeds were at the outset intended for children.

Bewick ran his workshop collaboratively, developing the skills of his apprentices, so while he did not complete every task for every illustration himself, he was always closely involved, as John Rayner explains:

Major works 

Works using his wood engraving technique, for which he became well known, include the engravings for Oliver Goldsmith's Traveller and The Deserted Village, for Thomas Parnell's Hermit, and for William Somervile's Chase. But "the best known of all Bewick's prints" is said by The Bewick Society to be The Chillingham Bull, executed by Bewick on an exceptionally large woodblock for Marmaduke Tunstall, a gentleman who owned an estate at Wycliffe in the North Riding of Yorkshire.

Tail-pieces 

The tail- or tale-pieces, a Bewick speciality, are small engravings chosen to fill gaps such as those at the ends of the species articles in British Birds, each bird's description beginning on a new page. The images are full of life and movement, often with a moral, sometimes with humour, always with sympathy and precise observation, so the images tell a tale as well as being at the tail ends of articles. For example, the runaway cart, at the end of "The Sparrow-Hawk", fills what would otherwise be a 5 cm (2 in) high gap. Hugh Dixon explains:

Bookplates 

The workshop of Beilby, Bewick, and son produced many ephemeral materials such as letterhead stationery, shop advertisement cards, and other business materials. Of these ephemeral productions, "bookplates have survived the best". Bewick's bookplates were illustrations made from engravings, containing the name or initials of the book's owner.

Aesop's Fables 

The various editions of Aesop's Fables illustrated by Bewick span almost his entire creative life. The first was created for the Newcastle bookseller Thomas Saint during his apprentice years, an edition of Robert Dodsley's Select Fables published in 1776. With his brother John he later contributed to a three-volume edition for the same publisher in 1784, reusing some pictures from the 1776 edition.

Bewick went on to produce a third edition of the fables. While convalescing from a dangerous illness in 1812, he turned his attention to a long-cherished venture, a large three-volume edition of The Fables of Aesop and Others, eventually published in 1818. The work is divided into three sections: the first has some of Dodsley's fables prefaced by a short prose moral; the second has "Fables with Reflections", in which each story is followed by a prose and a verse moral and then a lengthy prose reflection; the third, "Fables in Verse", includes fables from other sources in poems by several unnamed authors. Engravings were initially designed on the wood by Bewick and then cut by his apprentices under close supervision, refined where necessary by himself. This edition used a method that Bewick had pioneered, "white-line" engraving, a dark-to-light technique in which the lines to remain white are cut out of the woodblock.

A General History of Quadrupeds 

A General History of Quadrupeds appeared in 1790. It deals with 260 mammals from across the world, including animals from "Adive" to "Zorilla". It is particularly thorough on some of the domestic animals: the first entry describes the horse. Beilby and Bewick had difficulty deciding what to include, and especially on how to organise the entries. They had hoped to arrange the animals systematically, but they found that the rival systems of Linnaeus, Buffon and John Ray conflicted, and in Linnaeus's case at least changed with every edition of his work. They decided to put useful animals first "which so materially contribute to the strength, the wealth, and the happiness of this kingdom".

The book's coverage is erratic, a direct result of the sources that Bewick consulted: his own knowledge of British animals, the available scholarly sources, combined with George Culley's 1786 Observations on Livestock and the antique John Caius's 1576 On English Dogs. Bewick had to hand the Swedish naturalist Anders Sparrman's account of his visit to the Cape of Good Hope on Cook's expedition of 1772 to 1776, and animals from the Southern Cape figure largely in the book. It was an energetic muddle, but it was at once greeted with enthusiasm by the British public. They liked the combination of vigorous woodcuts, simple and accurate descriptions, and all kinds of exotic animals alongside things they knew.

A History of British Birds 

A History of British Birds, Bewick's great achievement and with which his name is inseparably associated, was published in two volumes: History and Description of Land Birds in 1797 and History and Description of Water Birds in 1804, with a supplement in 1821. The Birds is specifically British, but is the forerunner of all modern field guides. Bewick was helped by his intimate knowledge of the habits of animals acquired during his frequent excursions into the country. He also recounts information passed to him by acquaintances and local gentry, and that obtained in natural history works of his time, including those by Thomas Pennant and Gilbert White, as well as the translation of Buffon's Histoire naturelle.

Many of the illustrations that have most frequently been reproduced in other books and as decorations are the small tailpieces that Bewick had placed at the bottoms of the pages of the original. The worlds depicted are so small that a magnifying glass is necessary to examine their detail; each scene, as Adrian Searle writes, "is a small and often comic revelation", each tiny image giving "enormous pleasure"; Bewick "was as inventive as he was observant, as funny and bleak as he was exacting and faithful to the things he saw around him."

Bewick's biographer, Jenny Uglow, writes that

Bewick sometimes used his fingerprint as a form of signature, (accompanied by the words "Thomas Bewick his mark"), as well as engraving it in one of his tail-pieces as if it had clouded the tiny image of a rustic scene with a cottage by mistake. Uglow notes one critic's suggestion that Bewick may have meant we are looking at the scene through a playfully smudged window, as well as drawing our attention to Bewick, the maker. Adrian Searle, writing in The Guardian, describes the tiny work as "A visual equivalent to the sorts of authorial gags Laurence Sterne played in Tristram Shandy, it is a marvellous, timeless, magical joke."

Tributes 

Poetical tributes came to Bewick even during his lifetime. William Wordsworth began his anecdotal poem "The Two Thieves", composed in 1798, with the line "O now that the genius of Bewick were mine", in which case he would give up writing, he declared.

In 1823, Bewick's friend the Reverend J. F. M. Dovaston dedicated a sonnet to him with the lines

Xylographer I name thee, Bewick, taughtBy thy wood-Art, that from rock, flood, and treeHome to our hearths, all lively, light and freeIn suited scene each living thing has broughtAs life elastic, animate with thought.

Four years after his death, his sixteen-year-old admirer Charlotte Brontë wrote a poem of 20 quatrains titled "Lines on the celebrated Bewick" which describe the various scenes she comes across while leafing through the books illustrated by him. Later still, the poet Alfred Tennyson left his own tribute on the flyleaf of a copy of Bewick's History of British Birds found in Lord Ravenscroft's library:
A gate and field half ploughed, 
A solitary cow, 
A child with a broken slate, 
And a titmarsh in the bough. 
But where, alack, is Bewick 
To tell the meaning now?

There are numerous portraits of Bewick. In 1825, the Literary and Philosophical Society commissioned Edward Hodges Baily to sculpt a marble portrait bust of Bewick; there are several copies beside the one still at the Society itself. According to Uglow, when Bewick came to sit for the sculptor, he "stoutly refused to be portrayed in a toga. Instead he wore his ordinary coat and waistcoat with neckcloth and ruffled shirt, and even asked for some of his smallpox scars to be shown." Baily was so taken with him that he presented Bewick with a plaster model of the finished bust. A bronze copy now rests in a niche of the building that replaced his workshop in the churchyard of Saint Nicholas (see above) and still another is at the British Museum. There is also a full-length statue of him at the top left of the former chemist's shop designed by M.V.Treleaven at 45 Northumberland Street in the city.

Legacy 

Bewick's fame, already nationwide across Britain for his Birds, grew during the nineteenth century. In 1830, William Yarrell named Bewick's swan in his honour and Bewick's son Robert engraved the bird for later editions of British Birds.

The critic John Ruskin compared the subtlety of his drawing to that of Holbein, J. M. W. Turner, and Paolo Veronese writing that the way Bewick had engraved the feathers of his birds was "the most masterly thing ever done in woodcutting". His fame faded as illustration became more widespread and more mechanical, but twentieth-century artists such as Gwen Raverat continued to admire his skill, and work by artists such as Paul Nash and Eric Ravilious has been described as reminiscent of Bewick.

Hugh Dixon, reflecting on Bewick and the landscape of North-East England, wrote that

Thomas Bewick Primary School, in West Denton in Newcastle upon Tyne, is named after him. Bewick's works are held in collections including the British Museum and the Victoria and Albert Museum. Newcastle's City Library has a collection of works and associated items based on the Pease Bequest which was made to the city by John William Pease in 1901. Bewick is memorialised around Newcastle and Gateshead with streets named after him, and plaques mark his former homes and workshops.

Bibliography 

 The 1784 edition of Fables of Aesop and others
 The 1818 edition of the fables; there is also an online fable by fable facsimile 
 
 
 Volume 1: Containing the History and Description of Land Birds
 Volume 2: Containing the History and Description of Water Birds
 Bewick, Thomas (1862). A Memoir of Thomas Bewick. Longman, Green, Longman, and Roberts.
--- (1975). Iain Bain (editor). Oxford University Press.

Notes

References

Sources

Further reading 

 Online publications of books about and illustrated by Bewick 
 
 Bain, Iain (rev. edn. 1989). The Workshop of Thomas Bewick. Mickley, Stockspield: Thomas Bewick Birthplace Trust 
 Croal, Thomson David (1882). Life and Works of Thomas Bewick. The Art Journal Office, London.
  
 Donald, Diana (2013). The Art of Thomas Bewick. Reaktion Books.
 Hall, Marshall (2005). The Artists of Northumbria. Art Dictionaries. 
 Holmes, June (2006). The Many Faces of Bewick. Natural History Society of Northumbria Transactions.
 Robinson, Robert (1887). Thomas Bewick, His Life and Times. Printed for Robert Robinson, Newcastle.
 Weekley, Montague (1953). Thomas Bewick. Oxford University Press.

External links 

The Bewick Society, which also has a useful bibliography and lists of resources
Bewick at the Newcastle Collection
Laing Art Gallery (Tyne and Wear Museums): Thomas Bewick
University of Manchester: George Johnson Wood-Engraving Collection
Bookplates by Thomas Bewick in the University of Delaware Library's William Augustus Brewer Bookplate Collection

A selection of high-resolution scans of pages from Bewick's books, featuring woodcut illustrations from the Linda Hall Library

1753 births
1828 deaths
British illustrators
English wood engravers
English illustrators
People from Mickley, Northumberland
British bird artists
Natural history illustrators
18th-century English male artists
19th-century English male artists